The OCD Project is an American reality television series that debuted on May 27, 2010. The series follows Dr. David Tolin and his exposure-based treatment of six patients living together in a Southern California mansion.  The treatment, called exposure and response prevention, can seem unorthodox, but is the leading evidence-based treatment for OCD.

Cast

Episodes

References

External links

2010s American reality television series
2010 American television series debuts
2010 American television series endings
English-language television shows
VH1 original programming
Works about obsessive–compulsive disorder